The West Computers (West Area Computing Unit, West Area Computers) were the African American, female mathematicians who worked as human computers at the Langley Research Center of NACA (predecessor of NASA) from 1943 through 1958. These women were a subset of the hundreds of female mathematicians who began careers in aeronautical research during World War II. To offset the loss of manpower as men joined the war effort, many U.S. organizations began hiring, and actively recruiting, more women and minorities during the 1940s. In 1935, the Langley Research Center had five female human computers on staff. By 1946, the Langley Research Center had recruited about 400 female human computers.

The West Computers were originally subject to Virginia's Jim Crow laws and got their name because they worked at Langley's West Area, while the white mathematicians worked in the East section. In order to work at NACA, the applicants had to pass a civil service exam.  Despite Executive Order 8802 outlawing discriminatory hiring practices in defense industries, the Jim Crow laws of Virginia overpowered it and made it more difficult for African American women to be hired than white women.  If the applicant was black, they would also have to complete a chemistry course at the nearby Hampton Institute. Even though they did the same work as the white female human computers at Langley, the West Computers were required to use segregated work areas, bathrooms, and cafeterias. The West Computers were originally sequestered into the West Area of Langley, hence their nickname. In 1958, when the NACA made the transition to NASA, segregated facilities, including the West Computing office, were abolished.

The work of human computers at Langley varied. However, most of the work involved reading, analyzing, and plotting data.  The human computers did this work by hand. They would work one-on-one with engineers or in computing sections. The computers played major roles in aircraft testing, supersonic flight research, and the space program. Although the female computers were as skilled as their male counterparts, they were officially hired as "subprofessionals" while males held "professional" status.  The status of professional allowed newly-hired males to be paid  annually (about $ in ) while newly-hired females began at  annually (about $ in ) due to their subprofessional title.

According to an unpublished study by Beverly E. Golemba of Langley's early computers, a number of other women did not know about the West Computers. That said, both the black and white women Golemba interviewed recalled that when computers from both groups were assigned to a project together, "everyone worked well together."

On November 8, 2019, the Congressional Gold Medal was awarded "In recognition of all the women who served as computers, mathematicians, and engineers at the National Advisory Committee for Aeronautics and the National Aeronautics and Space Administration (NASA) between the 1930s and the 1970s."

Notable members

In 1949, Dorothy Vaughan was put in charge of supervising the West Computers. She was the first African American manager at NASA. Vaughan was a mathematician who worked at Langley from 1943 through her retirement in 1971. She was an excellent  programmer in FORTRAN, a popular computer programming language that is especially suited to numeric computation and scientific computing. Mary Jackson was involved in fluid dynamics (air streams) and flight tests.  Her job was to get relevant data from experiments and conduct tests. Mathematician Katherine Johnson, who in 2015 was named a Presidential Medal of Freedom recipient, joined the West Area Computing group in 1953. She was subsequently reassigned to Langley's Flight Research Division, where she performed notable work including providing the trajectory analysis for astronaut John Glenn's MA-6 Project Mercury orbital spaceflight. Katherine started her career working with information from flight tests, but later on a portion of her math work and research were used in lectures called Notes on Space Technology and taught to many students. These talks were given by engineers that later shaped the Space Task Group,  that helped with space travel. The work of all three women (Vaughan, Johnson, and Jackson) is featured in the 2016 film Hidden Figures.  Note that this film incorrectly depicts NASA as segregated.  Desegregation occurred in 1958 in the transition from NACA to NASA.

Protesting Segregation 
Some of the West Computers engaged in small acts of protest against segregation at Langley. Many small protests occurred in the segregated dining room since colored women were forbidden to enter the white cafeteria.  Miriam Mann repeatedly removed signs denoting where "coloured girls" could sit for their meals. Both Katherine Johnson and Mary Winston Jackson refused to use the segregated cafeterias and exclusively ate at their desks.  Katherine Johnson also refused to use segregated restrooms since they were on the opposite side of the campus, so she used an unmarked restroom. After discovering that the males on her team were attending meetings to share important information about their current tasks, Katherine Johnson also began attending these meetings despite no other women being invited to participate.  She participated heavily during these meetings by frequently asking questions and engaging in discussions.

Christine Darden became an engineer after demonstrating that she possessed or exceeded all skills and qualifications male engineers had and asked to be moved to the engineering pool instead of continuing to be a computer.

See also 
Melba Roy Mouton

References

 
Sex segregation